Amolops gerbillus is a species of frog found in Asia. It is native to northern and northeastern India, Tibet (China), and Myanmar, and possibly to Bhutan and Nepal. Its common names include Yembung sucker frog and gerbil stream frog. It is a semi-aquatic frog occurring in hill streams.

References

gerbillus
Amphibians of China
Frogs of India
Amphibians of Myanmar
Fauna of Tibet
Amphibians described in 1912
Taxa named by Nelson Annandale